The Strat Pack: Live in Concert is a film of a September 24, 2004, concert featuring Joe Walsh, Gary Moore, Brian May (playing the Sunburst Stratocaster, in the opening set, rather than his signature guitar  Red Special  ), Hank Marvin, David Gilmour, Mike Rutherford and many more, marking the 50th Anniversary of the Fender Stratocaster guitar. The film was released in 2005.

Track listing
 "Peggy Sue" (Jerry Allison, Buddy Holly, Norman Petty)
 "Maybe Baby" (Holly, Petty)
 "I Fought the Law" (Sonny Curtis)
 "Oh Boy" (Petty, Bill Tilghman, Sonny West)
 "That'll Be the Day" (Allison, Holly)
Tracks 1-5 performed by The Crickets, Albert Lee and Brian May.
 "The Rise and Fall of Flingel Bunt" (Brian Bennett, Hank Marvin, John Rostill, Bruce Welch)
 "Sleep Walk" (Ann Farina, Johnny Farina, Santo Farina, Don Wolf)
 "Apache" (Jerry Lordan)
Tracks 6-8 performed by Hank Marvin and Ben Marvin.
 "I'm on My Way" (Theresa Andersson)
Performed by Theresa Andersson.
 "Country Boy" (Tony Colton, Albert Lee, Ray Smith)
Performed by Albert Lee and Theresa Andersson.
 "How Long" (Paul Carrack)
 "All Along the Watchtower" (Bob Dylan) with Andy Fairweather-Low
 "While My Guitar Gently Weeps" (George Harrison) with Andy Fairweather-Low
 "I Can't Dance" (Tony Banks, Phil Collins, Mike Rutherford)
Tracks 11-14 performed by Mike Rutherford and Paul Carrack.
 "Red House" (Jimi Hendrix)
Performed by Gary Moore.
 "Angel" (Hendrix)
Performed by Jamie Cullum
 "Take the Box" (Luke Smith, Amy Winehouse)
 "In My Bed" (Salaam Remi, Winehouse)
 "Stronger than Me" (Remi, Winehouse)
Tracks 17-19 performed by Amy Winehouse.
 "Muddy Water Blues" (Paul Rodgers)
Performed by Paul Rodgers.
 "Drinking" (Bôa)
Performed by Paul Rodgers, Steve Rodgers and Jasmine Rodgers.
 "All Right Now" (Andy Fraser, Rodgers)
Performed by Paul Rodgers and Brian May.
 "Can't Get Enough" (Mick Ralphs)
Performed by Paul Rodgers and Joe Walsh.
 "Funk 49" (Jim Fox, Dale Peters, Joe Walsh)
 "Life's Been Good" (Walsh)
 "Life In The Fast Lane" (Glenn Frey, Don Henley, Walsh)
 "Rocky Mountain Way" (Rocke Grace, Kenny Passarelli, Joe Vitale, Walsh)
Tracks 23-27 performed by Joe Walsh.
 "6PM" (Phil Manzanera)
Performed by Phil Manzanera.
 "Marooned" (David Gilmour, Richard Wright)
 "Coming Back to Life" (Gilmour)
 "Sorrow" (Gilmour)
Tracks 29-31 performed by David Gilmour and Phil Manzanera.
 "Ooh La La" (Ronnie Lane, Ronnie Wood)
Performed by Ronnie Wood.
 Stay with Me (Rod Stewart, Wood)
Performed by all the Cast except Hank and Ben Marvin.

Personnel
Joe Walsh: Guitar, vocals
David Gilmour: Guitar, vocals
Brian May: Guitar, vocals
Paul Rodgers: Guitar, vocals
Ronnie Wood: Guitar, vocals
Hank Marvin: Guitar, vocals
The Crickets: Guitar, vocals
Albert Lee: Guitar, vocals
Gary Moore: Guitar, vocals
Mike Rutherford: Guitar, vocals
Paul Carrack: Guitar, piano, vocals
Phil Manzanera: Guitar, vocals
Amy Winehouse: Guitar, vocals
Jamie Cullum: Keyboard, vocals
Theresa Andersson: Guitar, fiddle, vocals
Andy Fairweather-Low: Guitar, vocals
Annie Clements: Bass guitar
Ben Marvin: Guitar
Cassandra Malaise: Backing Vocals

Support band
Phil Palmer: Guitar
Pino Palladino: Bass guitar
Paul "Wix" Wickens: Keyboards
Ian Thomas: Drums and percussion
Cassandra (Sandra) Malaise: Backing vocals
Margo Buchanan: Backing vocals
Steve Balsamo: Backing vocals
Helen McRobbie: Backing vocals

Venue
Wembley Arena

Certifications

References

Concert films
2000s English-language films